La Roquette-sur-Var (literally La Roquette on Var;) is a commune in the Alpes-Maritimes department in southeastern France. It is one of sixteen villages grouped together by the Métropole Nice Côte d'Azur tourist department as the Route des Villages Perchés (Route of Perched Villages). The others are: Aspremont, Carros, Castagniers, Coaraze, Colomars, Duranus, Èze, Falicon, La Gaude, Lantosque, Levens, Saint-Blaise, Saint-Jeannet, Tourrette-Levens and Utelle.

Population

See also
Communes of the Alpes-Maritimes department

References

Communes of Alpes-Maritimes
Alpes-Maritimes communes articles needing translation from French Wikipedia